= Blue Man Cape =

Peninsula in Nunavut, Canada

Coordinates: 79°45′07″N 086°19′55″W

Blue Man Cape (or Blueman Cape) is a peninsula in the Qikiqtaaluk Region, Nunavut, Canada. It is located on Ellesmere Island.
